The Laurel–Langley Agreement was a trade agreement signed in 1955 between the United States and its former colony the Philippines. It expired in 1974.  It was an amendment to the Bell Trade Act, which gave full parity rights to American citizens and businesses.

Provisions 
The Laurel-Langley Agreement ended the free American market for sugar produced in the Philippines; it had been, before the agreement, exported to the U.S. duty-free. After the 1960s, exports from the Philippines increased significantly due to the American embargo against Cuba. 

The agreement also ended the authority of the United States to control the exchange rate of the Philippine peso. Up until the agreement, it had been pegged to the American dollar at the rate of two pesos to one dollar.

References

Treaties of the Philippines
Economic history of the Philippines
Treaties of the United States
Treaties concluded in 1955
Philippines–United States relations
Commercial treaties
Presidency of Ramon Magsaysay
History of foreign trade of the United States